David Scofield may refer to:
 David Paul Scofield (1922–2008), British actor
 David H. Scofield (1840–1905), American soldier